Events in the year 1974 in Norway.

Incumbents
 Monarch – Olav V
 Prime Minister – Trygve Bratteli (Labour Party)

Events

 2 January – The drilling rig "Transocean 3" sinks in the North Sea.
 1 February – Lillehammer affair: Five Israeli Mossad agents are sentenced to prison terms for the assassination of Ahmed Bouchiki. The prison terms ranged from two and a half to five years, although all the agents were eventually released within 22 months and deported back to Israel.
 15 September – The wreck of the Danish slave ship Fredensborg, which sank during a storm in 1768, is discovered off the coast of Tromøya.
 31 October – Parliament rejects a bill on abortion.
 20 December – Kirsten Ohm is named by the King-in-Council as Norway's first female ambassador, assuming office in 1975.

Popular culture

Sports

Music 

Inger Lise Rypdal and Benny Borg win the 1973 Spellemannprisen in the female and male vocalist categories respectively. Christiania Jazzband, Saft, Torkil Bye/Brynjar Hoff, Lillebjørn Nilsen, Bjørn Sand/Totto Osvold and Oddvar Nygaards Kvartett also receive the award. Dizzie Tunes win in the category "Music for children" and Sigbjørn Bernhoft Osa win the Special Award.

Film

Literature
Haiene, novel by Jens Bjørneboe

Notable births
 
 

4 January – Sjur Miljeteig, trumpet player and composer
31 January – Kristine Duvholt Havnås, handball player.
17 March – Bjarte Breiteig, short story writer
18 March – Anne Tønnessen, footballer.
28 March – Marianne Sivertsen Næss, politician.
30 March – Sigbjørn Gjelsvik, politician.
31 March – Linda Konttorp, sailor.
22 May – Anne Beathe Tvinnereim, diplomat and politician.
13 June – Noman Mubashir, journalist
19 June – Mari Rege, economist and university economics professor
7 July – Ingeborg Arvola, writer.
2 August – Karianne Bråthen, politician.
9 August – Cecilie Skog, adventurer.
1 September – Hilde Østbø, handball player.
14 September – Mette Solli, kickboxer.
25 September – Bente Elin Lilleøkseth, politician
2 December – Trude Gimle, alpine skier.

Notable deaths

16 January – Johannes Olai Olsen, politician (b.1895)
7 February – Sigge Johannessen, gymnast and Olympic silver medallist (b.1884)
14 February – Halfdan Schjøtt, sailor and Olympic gold medallist (b.1893)
May – Leif Høegh, shipowner (b.1896)
19 June – Aasmund Brynildsen, essayist, biographer, magazine editor and publishing house consultant (b.1917)
4 July – Francis Bull, literary historian, professor, essayist and magazine editor (b.1887).
20 August – Haldor Bjerkeseth, politician (b.1883)
22 August – Sverre Hansen, international soccer player and Olympic bronze medallist (b.1913)
25 September – Hartmann Bjørnsen, gymnast and Olympic gold medallist (b.1889)
18 October – Anders Lange, politician (b.1904)
13 November – Jens Lunde, politician (b.1884)
17 December – Jørgen Bru, sport shooter (b.1881)

Full date unknown
Ørnulf Bast, sculptor (b.1907)
Halfdan Haneborg Hansen, military officer, Milorg pioneer and businessman (born 1890).
Kirsten Hansteen, politician and Minister, first female member of cabinet in Norway (b.1903)
Sonja Aase Ludvigsen, politician and Minister (b.1928)
 Tormod Normann, lawyer, competitive swimmer and sports administrator (born 1905).
Sverre Petterssen, meteorologist (b.1898)
Arne Skaug, politician and Minister (b.1906)
Axel Heiberg Stang, politician and Minister (b.1904)
Gabriel Thorstensen, gymnast and Olympic gold medallist (b.1888)
Nils Voss, gymnast and Olympic gold medallist (b.1886)

See also

References

External links